William Newton (c. 1783 – 4 November 1862) was an English politician.

He was the son of Samuel (or James) Newton, a well-to-do St Kitts slave owner from Stowey, Somerset. He was educated at Eton and Pembroke College, Oxford. He settled in Suffolk in 1813 after his father purchased Elveden Hall, near Thetford from the 4th Earl of Albemarle.

He was elected Member of Parliament (MP) for Ipswich in 1818, narrowly defeating Henry Baring by 32 votes.

He was married 13 December 1811 in Ferry Fryston, Yorkshire. His wife Elizabeth (or Eliza) was the daughter of Richard Slater Milnes, MP for the city of York. William and Eliza had ten children; their fifth son Alfred Newton became a famous ornithologist, their sixth, Edward Newton, a colonial administrator.

On his death in 1862 Elveden Hall was sold to the Maharajah Duleep Singh.

References

History of Parliament NEWTON, William (?1783-1862) of Elveden, Suffolk

1780s births
1862 deaths
People educated at Eton College
Members of the Parliament of the United Kingdom for Ipswich
UK MPs 1812–1818
People from Elveden